{{Speciesbox
| image = HollandHesperiidaeAfricaPlate2.jpg
| image_caption = Figure 16
| status = LC
| status_system = IUCN3.1
| status_ref = 
| taxon = Nervia wallengrenii
| authority = (Trimen, 1883)
| synonyms =
 Thymelicus wallengrenii Trimen, 1883
 Baracus fenestratus Butler, 1894
 Kedestes wallengrenii (Trimen, 1883)
}}Nervia wallengrenii, also known as Wallengren's ranger or Wallengren's skipper, is a species of butterfly in the family Hesperiidae. It is found in South Africa (KwaZulu-Natal, Transvaal), Zimbabwe and from Mozambique to Kenya. The habitat consists of grassland and woodland.

The wingspan is 27–31 mm for males and 30-35 for females. Adults are on wing from August to November and from February to April. There are two generations per year.

The larvae probably feed on Imperata cylindrica.

SubspeciesNervia wallengrenii wallengrenii - Uganda, Kenya, Tanzania, Zambia, Mozambique, Zimbabwe, Eswatini, South Africa: Limpopo Province, Mpumalanga, North West Province, Gauteng, Free State Province, KwaZulu-NatalNervia wallengrenii fenestratus'' (Butler, 1894) - Tanzania, Malawi

References

Butterflies described in 1883
Butterflies of Africa
Taxa named by Roland Trimen